Jamel Eddine Gharbi is a Tunisian politician. He serves as the Minister of Planning and Regional Development under Prime Minister Hamadi Jebali.

Biography

Early life
Jamel Eddine Gharbi was born on December 4, 1964 in Jendouba. He received a PhD in Management from HEC Montréal in Montreal, Quebec, Canada.

Career in academia
He started his career as a university professor, and eventually served as Vice President of the University of Jendouba.

Politics
He is a member of the Ennahda Movement. On 20 December 2011, he joined the Jebali Cabinet as Minister of Planning and Regional Development.

Personal life
He is married, and has four children.

Bibliography
Ontologie du marketing
Epistémologie du marketing

References

Living people
1964 births
HEC Montréal alumni
Tunisian Muslims
Government ministers of Tunisia
People from Jendouba Governorate
Ennahda politicians